The Elliot Water is a minor river in Angus, Scotland. The Elliot rises near West Hills in Carmyllie and flows through the parish and village of Arbirlot before reaching the North Sea at Elliot, on the west side of Arbroath. The total length is around 7½ miles or 12 km. 

The Elliot has been designated as a "freshwater fish protected area" by the Scottish Environment Protection Agency.

References 

Visit Angus - Elliot Nature Trail

Rivers of Angus, Scotland